Larressingle is a commune in the Gers department in southwestern France.

Geography

Population

Sights
 Château de Larressingle (c. 1250 – c. 1550), ruins
Walls
Port of Artigue
Castle
Church of St. Sigismund
Siege machines

Notable people
 André Adam (1936–2016), diplomat

See also
Communes of the Gers department

References

Communes of Gers
Plus Beaux Villages de France
World Heritage Sites in France